Goethestraße is a luxury shopping street in the city centre of Frankfurt, Germany, located between Opernplatz (in the west) and Börsenstraße and Goetheplatz (in the east) in the district of Innenstadt and within the Opera Quarter and the broader central business district known as the Bankenviertel. It is a parallel street of Freßgass and located in the immediate vicinity of Kaiserhofstraße. The street is Germany's third-busiest luxury shopping street.

The street was constructed between 1892 and 1894 and named for Johann Wolfgang von Goethe.

Public transport
Goethestraße is served by nearby Frankfurt Hauptwache station (in the east) and the Alte Oper station of the Frankfurt U-Bahn (in the west).

Businesses 
Retail establishments in Goethestraße include: Armani, Bally, Bulgari, Burberry, Chanel,   Ermenegildo Zegna, Gucci, Hermès, Hugo Boss, Jil Sander, Louis Vuitton, Longchamp,   Jimmy Choo, Montblanc, Patek Philippe,  Prada, Salvatore Ferragamo, Tiffany & Co., Tumi, Versace, and Vertu.

References

External links
 Official page

Streets in Frankfurt
Shopping districts and streets in Germany
Tourist attractions in Frankfurt
Bankenviertel